Cranberry Isles is a town in Hancock County, Maine, United States. The population was 160 at the 2020 census.

Geography

The  Town of Cranberry Isles includes five islands: Great Cranberry Island (with the postal designation Cranberry Isles, ZIP code 04625), Little Cranberry Island (with the postal designation Islesford, ZIP code 04646), Sutton Island, Bear Island, and Baker Island. Only the first two islands have post offices or year-round populations.

Demographics

2010 census
As of the census of 2010, there were 141 people, 70 households, and 33 families residing in the town. The racial makeup of the town was 97.9% White, 0.7% African American, and 1.4% from two or more races. Hispanic or Latino of any race were 2.1% of the population.

There were 70 households, of which 20.0% had children under the age of 18 living with them, 37.1% were married couples living together, 5.7% had a female householder with no husband present, 4.3% had a male householder with no wife present, and 52.9% were non-families. 42.9% of all households were made up of individuals, and 20% had someone living alone who was 65 years of age or older. The average household size was 2.01 and the average family size was 2.70.

The median age in the town was 47.7 years. 17.7% of residents were under the age of 18; 4.3% were between the ages of 18 and 24; 23.3% were from 25 to 44; 34% were from 45 to 64; and 20.6% were 65 years of age or older. The gender makeup of the town was 54.6% male and 45.4% female.

2000 census
As of the census of 2000, there were 128 people living year round in the Cranberry Isles. The population density of Great Cranberry Island was 40.3 people per square mile (15.6/km). The racial makeup of the town was 98.44% White, and 1.56% from two or more races.

See also
 List of islands of Maine

References

External links
Town website

Towns in Hancock County, Maine
Towns in Maine
Populated coastal places in Maine